Cigaritis gilletti is a butterfly in the family Lycaenidae. It is found in Somalia.

References

Butterflies described in 1925
Cigaritis
Endemic fauna of Somalia